Caelostomus ruber is a species of ground beetle in the subfamily Pterostichinae. It was described by Andrewes in 1922.

References

Caelostomus
Beetles described in 1922